Nemognathomimus is a genus of beetles in the family Cerambycidae, containing the following species:

 Nemognathomimus breviceps Giesbert, 1997
 Nemognathomimus michelbacheri Chemsak & Giesbert, 1986
 Nemognathomimus opacipennis Chemsak & Noguera, 1993
 Nemognathomimus pallidulus (Linsley, 1935)

References

Lepturinae